The HSC Tarifa Jet is an  fast catamaran ferry operated by Förde Reederei Seetouristik (FRS) Iberia S.L.

History
HSC Tarifa Jet was built in 1997 by Incat Australia Pty. Ltd. at their yards in Tasmania, Australia and was delivered  in May 1997.

Her operator, FRS's service between Continental Europe and Morocco was initiated in 2000 on a year-round basis.

Layout
The catamaran has an overall length of 86.62 meters, a beam of 26.00 m and a draft of 3.62 m, the gross tonnage amounts 4.995 GT.

Service

Regular routes
Tarifa - Tangier

Algeciras-Tangier

Gibraltar-Tangier

She has most recently operated as Pescara Jet for the Italian operator SNAV on a seasonal route between Pescara, Hvar and Split in the Adriatic Sea.

Sister ships
Condor Express
Condor Vitesse
Condor Rapide /

External links
 FRS Iberia official site
 Shipbuilder info

Ships built by Incat
Ferries of Morocco
Ferries of Spain
Incat high-speed craft
1997 ships
Individual catamarans